The Sabah Chinese High School is a high school in Tawau, Sabah, Malaysia.

See also
 Education in Malaysia

References

External links 
Sabah Chinese High School Official Website
Sabah Chinese High School Facebook page

Schools in Sabah
Secondary schools in Malaysia